Neofavolus alveolaris is a species of polypore fungus in the family Polyporaceae. It is widely distributed in the temperate areas of the Northern Hemisphere. Its kidney- or fan-shaped fruit bodies measure  in diameter. Initially reddish, they become cream to white when dry. The pores on the cap underside are angular to hexagonal and relatively large (0.5–3 mm diameter). The fungus causes a white rot in hardwoods.

References

Fungi described in 1815
Fungi of Asia
Fungi of North America
Fungi of Europe
Polyporaceae